The Phoenix is the debut album of Italian heavy metal  band Mastercastle.

History
The album was recorded in November and December 2008 at MusicArt studios (previously called Quakesound) (Genoa, Italy), but the composition began on July. The producer was Pier Gonella. For the song "Princess of love" was produced a videoclip. 
After the release of the album (17 April 2009) the Japanese label Spiritual Beast offered a deal to release a Japanese edition of the album, that was published on 20 September 2009 with 2 bonus track. One of them is the cover of the song Alien Nation, written by the hard rock/heavy metal band Scorpions.

Lyrics
The Phoenix is not a concept album. All lyrics are written by Giorgia Gueglio and are mostly influenced by human nature as well as  forgotten tales and events. In particular the song Greedy Blade tells about the disaster of Vajont, a dam on the Italian Alps that after a landslide, created a giant wave that destroyed towns and villages in the valley.

Track listing
 "Words Are Swords"
 "Princess of Love"
 "Space"
 "My Screams"
 "Lullaby Noir"
 "The Phoenix"
 "Greedy Blade"
 "Dawn of Promises"
 "Memories"
 "Cradle of Stone"

Line up
 Giorgia Gueglio - voice
 Pier Gonella - guitars
 Steve Vawamas - bass
 Alessandro Bissa Bix - drums

References

External links 
 Mastercastle - Official myspace site of the band

2009 debut albums
Mastercastle albums